The Armsby Block is an historic mixed-use residential and commercial building at 144-148 Main Street in Worcester, Massachusetts.  Built in 1885 to a design by noted local architect Stephen Earle, it is a well-preserved example of Panel Brick architecture.  The building was listed on the National Register of Historic Places in 1980.

Description and history
The Armsby Block is located on the west side of Main Street on the northern stretch of its downtown, adjacent to the former Elwood Adams Store.  It is a five-story masonry structure, with a brick facade.  The ground floor has two storefronts, which flank the recessed main building entrance.  Brick piers separate each of these elements, and are topped by a frieze band and rusticated sandstone stringcourse.  Upper level windows are set in rectangular openings with sandstone sills and lintels, and panels of brickwork between the second, third and fourth levels; a sandstone stringcourse separates the fourth and fifth floors.  The building is crowned by a band of brick corbelling and a parapet with a central gable.

The building was designed by Stephen Earle and built in 1885.  It originally housed stores on the ground floor and a boarding house on the upper floors.  It was built by the estate of George Armsby, who had been secretary of Worcester's Munroe Organ Reed Company.  The principal alterations to the building over time were to the storefronts; these changes have largely been reversed.  It currently contains offices for the Worcester County Sheriff and a restaurant at street level.

See also
National Register of Historic Places listings in northwestern Worcester, Massachusetts
National Register of Historic Places listings in Worcester County, Massachusetts

References

External links
 Worcester County Sheriff's Office
 The Armsby Abbey Restaurant

Commercial blocks on the National Register of Historic Places in Massachusetts
Commercial buildings completed in 1885
Buildings and structures in Worcester, Massachusetts
National Register of Historic Places in Worcester, Massachusetts